Mu-1 may refer to:

Midwest MU-1, a glider
Mu-1 rocket, a Japanese rocket